Jul Maroh (born Julie Maroh) is a French writer and illustrator of graphic novels who wrote Blue Is the Warmest Color (Le bleu est une couleur chaude, "Blue Is a Warm Colour"), a story about the life and love of two young lesbians that was adapted by Abdelatif Kechiche into the film Blue Is the Warmest Colour.

Biography
Maroh originates from Northern France. They got two diplomas there, in Visual Arts (comics option) in the École supérieure des arts Saint-Luc and in Lithography/Engraving at the Académie Royale des Beaux-Arts of Brussels.

Maroh is openly transgender and nonbinary. They started writing Blue is the Warmest Color when they were 19 and it took them five years to complete it.

Works
 Blue Is the Warmest Color (Le bleu est une couleur chaude), Arsenal Pulp Press, 2013 - . The title was originally published by Glénat in 2010 and received a prize at 2011 Angoulême International Comics Festival. It has been adapted in film by Abdelatif Kechiche with the title Blue Is the Warmest Colour (Palme d'Or at the 2013 Cannes Film Festival.
 Skandalon (2013)
 Brahms (2015)
 Body Music (2017) 
 You Brought Me The Ocean (2020)

References

Further reading

External links

 
 
 Maroh at Arsenal Pulp Press
 

French comics artists
Living people
LGBT comics creators
Female comics writers
1985 births
French LGBT novelists
French writers
French graphic novelists
Non-binary writers
Transgender non-binary people